Najafabad County is in Isfahan province, Iran. The capital of the county is the city of Najafabad. At the 2006 census, the county's population was 279,014 in 73,711 households. The following census in 2011 counted 300,288 people in 87,481 households. At the 2016 census, the county's population was 319,205 in 98,513 households.

Administrative divisions

The population history and structural changes of Najafabad County's administrative divisions over three consecutive censuses are shown in the following table. The latest census shows two districts, five rural districts, and five cities.

See also
 8th Najaf Ashraf Division

References

 

Counties of Isfahan Province